Richmond Hobson Hilton (October 8, 1898 – August 13, 1933) was a S.C. National Guard 118th Infantry Regiment, 30th Infantry Division, U.S. Army Sergeant during World War I, and a Medal of Honor recipient—the first of two from Kershaw County, South Carolina to be awarded the medal during that war. He was also awarded the Distinguished Conduct Medal by Great Britain, the Médaille militaire and Croix de Guerre with bronze palm by France, the Croce al Merito di Guerre by Italy, the Medalha da Cruz de Guerra, Third Class by Portugal, and the Medal for Military Bravery by Montenegro. All were awarded for bravery in the face of the enemy.

Biography
Hilton was born in Westville, South Carolina, and joined the army in Westville, assigned to Company M, 118th Infantry, 30th Division. On October 11, 1918, while fighting near Brancourt, France, Hilton's unit was held up by intense machine gun and small arms fire. Sgt. Hilton recognized that the machine gun fire was coming from a shell crater just ahead of them. Accompanied by several other soldiers, but moving out well ahead of them, Sgt. Hilton engaged the machine gun, using his rifle until his ammunition ran out, then using his pistol, killing six German soldiers, and capturing ten others. In the course of this action he was wounded by an exploding shell, which resulted in the loss of an arm.

After his discharge from the army, he returned home to Kershaw County a hero. He joined the Civitan Club of Columbia, of which he was a proud member. When asked why he was a Civitan, Hilton replied:

After his death in 1933, he was buried in "Old Quaker Cemetery" in Camden, South Carolina, which is also the cemetery in which World War I Medal of Honor recipient John Canty Villepigue is buried. He and Villepigue were both assigned to Company M, 118th Infantry, 30th Division, with Villepigue being awarded his Medal of Honor for actions taking place a few days later, on October 15, 1918, which resulted in injuries from which he later died. That cemetery also maintains the graves of Civil War Confederate Army Generals John Doby Kennedy and Joseph B. Kershaw, as well as Civil War hero Richard Rowland Kirkland.

Medal of Honor citation

Rank and organization: Sergeant, U.S. Army, Company M, 118th Infantry, 30th Division. Place and date: At Brancourt, France, October 11, 1918. Entered service at: Westville, South Carolina Born: October 8, 1898, Westville, South Carolina G.O. No.: 16, W.D., 1919.

Citation:

While Sgt. Hilton's company was advancing through the village of Brancourt it was held up by intense enfilading fire from a machinegun. Discovering that this fire came from a machinegun nest among shell holes at the edge of the town, Sgt. Hilton, accompanied by a few other soldiers, but well in advance of them, pressed on toward this position, firing with his rifle until his ammunition was exhausted, and then with his pistol, killing 6 of the enemy and capturing 10. In the course of this daring exploit he received a wound from a bursting shell, which resulted in the loss of his arm.

See also

List of Medal of Honor recipients
List of Medal of Honor recipients for World War I

References

1898 births
1933 deaths
United States Army non-commissioned officers
Military personnel from South Carolina
United States Army personnel of World War I
United States Army Medal of Honor recipients
People from Kershaw County, South Carolina
Recipients of the Cruz de Guerra
Recipients of the War Merit Cross (Italy)
World War I recipients of the Medal of Honor
Recipients of the Distinguished Conduct Medal
Burials in South Carolina